Ernesto Antonio Contreras Vásquez (19 June 1937 – 25 October 2020) was an Argentine cyclist. He competed at the 1960, 1964 and the 1968 Summer Olympics. He also won the Argentine National Road Race Championships in 1959, 1970 and 1971, as well as eight consecutive national pursuit championships from 1956 to 1963. 

Contreras died in 2020 at the age of 83, after being hospitalized for a heart attack and also testing positive for COVID-19. He was 83.

References

External links
 

1937 births
2020 deaths
Argentine male cyclists
Olympic cyclists of Argentina
Cyclists at the 1960 Summer Olympics
Cyclists at the 1964 Summer Olympics
Cyclists at the 1968 Summer Olympics
Sportspeople from Mendoza, Argentina
Pan American Games medalists in cycling
Pan American Games silver medalists for Argentina
Cyclists at the 1963 Pan American Games
Deaths from the COVID-19 pandemic in Argentina